Manoel's Destinies is a 1984 French-Portuguese children's fantasy film directed by Chilean filmmaker Raúl Ruiz. It was edited down from the three-part TV miniseries Manuel on the Island of Wonders .

Cast
 Ruben de Freitas as Manoel (7yo)
 Teresa Madruga as Manoel's Mother
 Fernando Heitor as Manoel's Father
 Marco Paulo de Freitas as Manoel (13yo)
 Diogo Dória as Captain Araujo
 Cecília Guimarães
 Vasco Pimentel
 José de Freitas
 Aurélie Chazelle
 Miguel Silva
 Pedro M. Ruivo

Further reading
 Goddard, Michael (2013); The Cinema of Raúl Ruiz: Impossible Cartographies. Wallflower Press, pp. 82–83.
 Solomon, Stefan (2017); "Education, destiny, and national identity in Raúl Ruiz's Manoel on the Island of Wonders" in Stephanie Hemelryk Donald, Emma Wilson, Sarah Wright (eds.) Childhood and Nation in Contemporary World Cinema: Borders and Encounters, Bloomsbury Academic, pp. 147–159.

References

External links

1984 films
1984 fantasy films
1980s French-language films
French fantasy films
Films directed by Raúl Ruiz
Films produced by Paulo Branco
French avant-garde and experimental films
1980s avant-garde and experimental films
1980s French films